The Gentle Art of Burglary is a 1916 American silent-short comedy directed by Raymond L. Schrock, starring William Garwood, Violet Mersereau, and Paddy Sullivan.

External links

References 

1916 comedy films
1916 films
Silent American comedy films
American silent short films
American black-and-white films
1916 short films
American comedy short films
1910s American films